Ḥiyal (singular ḥīla  "contortion, contrivance; device, subterfuge") is "legalistic trickery" in Islamic jurisprudence.
The main purpose of ḥiyal is to avoid straightforward observance of Islamic law in difficult situations while still obeying the letter of the law.
An example of hiyal is the practice of "dual purchase" to avoid the prohibition of usury by making two contracts of purchase and re-purchase (at a higher price), similar to the modern futures contract.
A special sub-field of ḥiyal is "oath-trickery" dedicated to the formulation of ambiguous statements designed to be interpreted as an oath or promise while leaving open loopholes to avoid perjury. Views on its admissibility in Islam have varied by schools of Islamic jurisprudence (Madhhab), by time period, and by type of ḥiyal.  A substantial literature on such tricks has developed in the Hanafi school of jurisprudence in particular.

In history and Madhhab
The study of ḥiyal was not uncontroversial in Islamic jurisprudence. It was at first classed as haram by the Shafiite school, although its great popularity eventually led to aspects of ḥiyal being recognized even in Shafiite treatises. By the 10th century, Shafiite authors wrote a number of ḥiyal treatises of their own, of which the work by al-Qazwini (died 1048) has survived, while others continued to denounce ḥiyal, among them al-Ghazali.
Since the 15th century, Shafiite opposition to ḥiyal had mostly disappeared, due to the fatwas by Ibn Hajar al-Asqalani outlawing its criticism.

Meanwhile, ḥiyal was more vigorously opposed by the Hanbali school.
Like the Shafiites, the Hanbali school eventually came to a more moderate view of the practice. 14th-century Hanbali scholar Ibn Qayyim Al-Jawziyya distinguished three types of ḥiyal, (1) clearly inadmissible, (2) clearly admissible and (3) of doubtful admissibility, i.e. recognized by Abū Hanīfa but not by other authorities. 14th century Malaki scholar al-Shatibi stated that al-hiyal are "generally illegal".

Debate on ḥiyal within the establishment of Islamic jurisprudence continues into the modern period.
In 1974, a publication by Muhammad ʿAbd-al-Wahhāb Buhairī, Al-Azhar University professor for hadith and fiqh, published a monograph on the question  ("trickery in Islamic law"), according to which only a limited number of ḥiyal are permissible.
Among the ḥiyal permitted by Buhairī is taʿrīḍ (deception by ambiguity) if it is employed to prevent a Muslim from coming to harm. 
Since the 1980s, there has been a trend of increased debate on the "purposes of sharia" in the context of which a number of scholars have argued for a revival of ḥiyal as a legitimate tool to improve the flexibility of sharia interpretation in view of the problem of Islam and modernity.
The nascent Islamic finance industry has also made invoked ḥiyal to defend its practices.

References

primary sources (Ḥiyal literature in Islamic jurisprudence)
Joseph Schacht (ed., trans.), Maḥmūd Ibn-al-Ḥasan al-Qazwīnī, Das kitab al hiial fi l-fiq (Buch der Rechtskniffe), 2nd ed. 1924, reprinted 2004.
Joseph Schacht (ed.), Muḥammad Ibn-al-Ḥasan aš-Šaibānī: Kitāb al-maḫāriǧ fi 'l-ḥiyal, 1930, reprinted 1968.
Joseph Schacht (ed.), Abū Bakr Aḥmad Ibn-ʿAmr Ibn-Muhair al-Ḫaṣṣāf aš-Šaibānī: Kitāb al-ḥiyal wa-l-maḫāriǧ, 1923, reprinted 1968.
Muḥammad ʿAbd-al-Wahhāb Buḥairī: Al-Ḥiyal fi š-šarīʿa al-islāmīya wa-šarḥ mā warada fī-hā min al-āyāt wa-l-aḥādīṯ au Kašf an-niqāb ʿan mauqiʿ al-ḥiyal min as-sunna wa'l-kitāb. Cairo: Maṭbaʿat as-Saʿāda, 1974.

secondary literature
 Joseph Schacht, "Ḥiyal" in The Encyclopaedia of Islam vol. III, 510b-513a. 
 Joseph Schacht: Die arabische Ḥiyal-Literatur. Ein Beitrag zur Erforschung der islamischen Rechtspraxis. In: Der Islam 15 (1926), 211–232.
 Satoe Horii: Die gesetzlichen Umgehungen im islamischen Recht (ḥiyal): unter besonderer Berücksichtigung der Ǧannat al-aḥkām wa-ǧunnat al-ẖuṣṣām des Ḥanafīten Saʿīd b. ʿAlī as-Samarqandī (gest. 12. Jhdt.). Berlin: Schwarz 2001.
Satoe Horii, "Reconsideration of Legal Devices (Ḥiyal) in Islamic Jurisprudence: The Ḥanafīs and Their "Exits" (Makhārij)", Islamic Law and Society Vol. 9, No. 3 (2002), pp. 312–357.

See also
Kitman
Taqiyya
Reservatio mentalis

Islamic terminology
Arabic words and phrases in Sharia
Sharia legal terminology
Deception
Circumvention
Ethically disputed judicial practices